In military terms, 113th Division or 113th Infantry Division may refer to:

 113th Division (People's Republic of China)
 113th Infantry Division (German Empire)
 113th Infantry Division (Wehrmacht)